"It Didn't Matter" is a song by the English band The Style Council which was their fifteenth single to be released. It was composed by lead singer Paul Weller, keyboardist Mick Talbot, and was released in January 1987. The song was duetted by Weller and his then-wife Dee C. Lee. It is the first single from the band's third album, The Cost of Loving, also known as the Orange album. Backed with "All Year Round", it became a hit, peaking at No. 9 in the UK, and No. 48 in both Australia, and New Zealand. It has remained one of their most enduring hits.

Compilation appearances
As well as the song's single release, it has featured on various compilation albums released by The Style Council. The song was included on The Singular Adventures of The Style Council, The Complete Adventures of The Style Council, and Greatest Hits.

Track listing
 12" Single (TSCX 12)
"It Didn't Matter" - 5:47
"It Didn't Matter (Instrumental)" - 5:47
"All Year Round" - 2:18

 7" Single (885 492-7)
"It Didn't Matter" - 4:49
"All Year Round" - 2:17

Personnel
Credits are adapted from the album's liner notes.
 Paul Weller - lead vocals, guitars
 Dee C. Lee - lead vocals, backing vocals
 Mick Talbot - keyboards
 Steve White - drums

Charts

References

1987 singles
The Style Council songs
Songs written by Paul Weller
1987 songs
Polydor Records singles
Funk songs
British synth-pop songs